Instyle Furniture is a British manufacturer and retailer of furniture, a trading name of R&M Deluxe Upholstery Ltd, headquartered in Hillington, Scotland. It was established in 1983. It was formerly known as Saveway Direct of Hamilton, and has been a family-run business for more than forty years.

In 2012 it went into receivership, due to rising debts and falling orders.

References

 Twelo

Furniture retailers of the United Kingdom
British furniture makers